George Thomas Kurian (August 4, 1931 Changanacherry – 2015) was an Indian (naturalized U.S. citizen) historian and writer known for being the editor of several encyclopedias and reference works. Kurian also was founder and president of the Society of Encyclopedists. He was coeditor of the World Christian Encyclopedia, The Encyclopedia of Christian Civilizations, the Dictionary of Christianity, and Encyclopedia of Christian Literature.

Life 
In 1951 Kurian earned a M.A. from Madras Christian College.

Kurian was the president of the Encyclopedia Society and the editor of 65 books including 28 encyclopedias. He was also a fellow of the World Academy of Art and Science.

His wife's name is Annie and his daughter Sarah Claudine.

Some works

References 

1931 births
2015 deaths
20th-century Indian historians
20th-century American historians
21st-century American historians